Heterodox Academy (HxA) is a non-profit advocacy group of academics working to counteract what they see as a lack of viewpoint diversity on college campuses, especially political diversity.

History
In 2011, Jonathan Haidt, a psychology professor at the University of Virginia, gave a talk at the Society for Personality and Social Psychology in which he argued that American conservatives were under-represented in social psychology and that this hinders research and damages the field's credibility. In 2015, Haidt was contacted by Nicholas Quinn Rosenkranz, a Georgetown University law professor, who had given a talk to the Federalist Society discussing a similar lack of conservatives in law and similarly argued that this undermines the quality of research and teaching. Haidt was also contacted by Chris C. Martin, a sociology graduate student at Emory University, who had published a similar paper in The American Sociologist about the lack of ideological diversity in sociology. Haidt, Martin, and Rosenkranz formed "Heterodox Academy" to address this issue.  Initial funding for the group came from the Richard Lounsbery Foundation and The Achelis and Bodman Foundation. The Heterodox Academy website was launched with 25 members in September 2015. A series of campus freedom of speech controversies, such as those surrounding Erika Christakis at Yale and the 2015–16 University of Missouri protests, coincided with an increase in membership.

Membership was initially open to tenured and pre-tenure professors, but has been expanded to adjunct professors, graduate students, and postdoctorals. The group has a selective membership application process which is partly intended to address imbalances toward any particular political ideology. In July 2017, the group had 800 members internationally. As of February 2018, around 1,500 college professors had joined Heterodox Academy, along with a couple hundred graduate students.

In 2018, Debra Mashek, a professor of psychology at Harvey Mudd College, was appointed as the executive director of Heterodox Academy, a position which she held until 2020, after which an interim executive director was appointed. In 2020, the organization had around 4,000 members.

Programs and activities
In 2016 and 2017, Heterodox Academy published an annual Heterodox Academy Guide to Colleges, a ranking based on "political conformity and orthodoxy".

In June 2018, Heterodox Academy held an inaugural Open Mind Conference in New York City, featuring several academic guests recently involved in campus free speech issues, like Robert Zimmer, Lucía Martínez Valdivia, Allison Stanger, Alice Dreger, and Heather Heying.

The organization administers a "Campus Expression Survey", designed to allow professors and college administrators to survey their students' feelings about freedom of expression on campus.

Ideology and reception
Heterodox Academy describes itself as non-partisan. In 2018, the group's website described its mission as encouraging political diversity to allow dissent and challenge errors.

Zack Beauchamp of Vox says that "by working to promote the idea that liberal bias and ... political correctness is  a crisis, they provide ammunition" to conservative lawmakers who would pass laws to restrict academic freedom. On a more concessive note, Beauchamp says that "Heterodox Academy's core staff are too principled to support such measures."'

In a July 2021 University World News article, historian of education Jonathan Zimmerman reported on faculty members’ concern about the consequences of dissent: "In a survey of 445 professors conducted last year by Heterodox Academy, over half said that they believed expressing a dissenting view at work could harm their careers."

See also
 Chicago principles
 Foundation for Individual Rights in Education
 Society for Academic Freedom and Scholarship

References

External links
 

Organizations established in 2015
2015 establishments in the United States
Advocacy groups in the United States
Freedom of expression organizations
Higher education in the United States